HR 5183 b is an exoplanet located 102.7 light years away in the constellation of Virgo orbiting the star HR 5183. It has a highly eccentric (e≃0.87) orbit which takes it from within the orbit of Jupiter to beyond the orbit of Neptune, which classifies it as an eccentric Jupiter and it has been nicknamed the "whiplash planet". It was discovered in 2019 based on two decades of radial velocity observations.

In 2021, astrometric observations revealed that HR 5183 b has a nearly edge-on orbital inclination, and thus its true mass is close to its minimum mass.

See also 

 Eccentric Jupiter
HD 80606 b
HD 20782 b

References

External links 
 Astronomers find bizarre planet 'unlike any other discovered so far', Cnet, AUGUST 27, 2019
  HR 5183, SIMBAD4
 Planet HR 5183 b, exoplanet.eu
 In the Presence of a Wrecking Ball: Orbital Stability in the HR 5183 System, Stephen R. Kane, Sarah Blunt, 8 Oct 2019

Exoplanets discovered in 2019
Exoplanets detected by radial velocity
Exoplanets detected by astrometry
Giant planets
Virgo (constellation)

fr:HR_5183#HR_5183_b,_la_planète